Piqueri is a train station on CPTM Line 7-Ruby, in the district of Pirituba in São Paulo. In the future, it will attend another CPTM line, still with no color or number defined, which should connect Piqueri station with the future Monte Belo station, in Butantã.

History
Piqueri station was opened by Santos-Jundiaí Railway (EFSJ) on 1 June 1960, named Quilômetro 88. Its location was often discussed in the 1960s, as in 1962, the station was renamed to Nossa Senhora do Ó. After much struggle between local associations, the station got its definitive name on 1 November 1969: Piqueri.

Later, RFFSA incorporated EFSJ and built a new station, reopened in August 1975.

Since 1994, it is operated by CPTM.

References

Companhia Paulista de Trens Metropolitanos stations
Railway stations opened in 1960